Bulgarian toponyms in Antarctica are approved by the Antarctic Place-names Commission in compliance with its Toponymic Guidelines, and formally given by the President of the Republic according to the Bulgarian Constitution and the established international and Bulgarian practice.  Place naming is confined to nameless geographic features situated in the Antarctic Treaty area, the region south of the parallel 60 degrees south latitude.

Details of the Bulgarian Antarctic toponyms are published by the websites of the commission and the international Composite Gazetteer of Antarctica maintained by the Scientific Committee on Antarctic Research (SCAR).

Alphabetical lists of the relevant place names:

 A
 B
 C
 D
 E
 F
 G
 H
 I
 J
 K
 L
 M
 N
 O
 P
 Q
 R
 S
 T
 U
 V
 W
 Y
 Z

See also 
 Antarctic Place-names Commission
 Composite Gazetteer of Antarctica
 Bulgarian placename etymology

External links 
 Bulgarian Antarctic Gazetteer
 SCAR Composite Gazetteer of Antarctica
 Antarctic Digital Database (ADD). Scale 1:250000 topographic map of Antarctica with place-name search.
 L. Ivanov. Bulgarian toponymic presence in Antarctica. Polar Week at the National Museum of Natural History in Sofia, 2–6 December 2019

Bibliography 
 J. Stewart. Antarctica: An Encyclopedia. Jefferson, N.C. and London: McFarland, 2011. 1771 pp.  
 L. Ivanov. Bulgarian Names in Antarctica. Sofia: Manfred Wörner Foundation, 2021. Second edition. 539 pp.  (in Bulgarian)
 G. Bakardzhieva. Bulgarian toponyms in Antarctica. Paisiy Hilendarski University of Plovdiv: Research Papers. Vol. 56, Book 1, Part A, 2018 – Languages and Literature, pp. 104-119 (in Bulgarian)
 L. Ivanov and N. Ivanova. Bulgarian names. In: The World of Antarctica. Generis Publishing, 2022. pp. 114-115. 

Antarctica
 
Bulgarian toponyms in Antarctica
Names of places in Antarctica